Donald James Martino (May 16, 1931 – December 8, 2005) was a Pulitzer Prize winning American composer.

Biography 
Born in Plainfield, New Jersey, Martino attended Plainfield High School. He began as a clarinetist, playing jazz for fun and profit. He attended Syracuse University, where he studied composition with Ernst Bacon, who encouraged him in that direction. He then attended Princeton University as a graduate student, where he worked with composers Roger Sessions and Milton Babbitt. He also studied with Luigi Dallapiccola in Italy as a Fulbright Scholar.

He became a lecturer and teacher himself, working with students at Yale University, the New England Conservatory of Music (where he became chair of the composition department), Brandeis University, and Harvard University.

He won the Pulitzer Prize for music in 1974 for his chamber work Notturno.

In 1991, the journal Perspectives of New Music published a 292-page tribute to Martino.

Martino died in Antigua in 2005. A memorial concert was held at the New England Conservatory on May 8, 2007. A recording of the concert was released by Navona Records in 2009.

Music 
Most of Martino's mature works (including pseudo-tonal works such as Paradiso Choruses and Seven Pious Pieces) were composed using the twelve-tone method; his sound world more closely resembled the lyrical Dallapiccola's than his other teachers'.

The pianist Easley Blackwood commissioned Martino's sonata Pianississimo, explicitly requesting that it be one of the most difficult pieces ever written. The resulting work is indeed of epic difficulty, but has been recorded several times. (Blackwood declined to perform it.)

Martino presented Milton Babbitt with at least two musical birthday cards: B,a,b,b,i,t,t on his 50th birthday and Triple Concerto on his 60th.

Musical compositions 
Many of the instrumental pieces have extensive doublings, such as flute/piccolo/alto flute. Principal publishers: Ione, Dantalian, McGinnis & Marx.

Works for orchestra and concertos
Sinfonia, 1953, withdrawn, unpublished 
Contemplations, 1956
Piano Concerto, 1965
Mosaic for Grand Orchestra, 1967
Cello Concerto, 1972
Ritorno, 1976, arr. for band, 1977 
Triple Concerto, clarinet, bass clarinet, contrabass clarinet, 1977 
Divertisements for Youth Orchestra, 1981
Alto Sax Concerto, 1987 
Violin Concerto, 1996
 Concertino (clarinet and orchestra), 2004
 Concerto for Orchestra, 2005

Chamber music
String Quartet No. 1, withdrawn, unpublished
String Quartet No. 2, 1952, withdrawn, unpublished
String Quartet Mo. 3, 1954, withdrawn, unpublished 
Seven Canoni Enigmatici, canons with resolutions (2 violas, 2 ‘cellos/2 bassoons, 1955; string quartet, 1962; 2 clarinets, alto clarinet/basset horn, bass clarinet, 1966, may be combined with version of 1955)
String Trio, 1955, withdrawn, unpublished 
Quartet (clarinet and string trio), 1957 
Trio (clarinet, violin, piano), 1959
Five Frammenti (oboe, double bass), 1961 
Concerto (wind quintet), 1964 
Notturno (piccolo/flute/alto flute, clarinet/bass clarinet,  violin, viola, ‘cello, piano, percussion), 1973 
String Quartet [No. 4], 1983 
Canzone e Tarantella sul Nome Petrassi (clarinet, ‘cello), 1984 
From the Other Side (flute, ‘cello, piano, percussion), 1988 
Three Sad Songs (viola, piano), 1991 
Octet (flute, clarinet, flugelhorn, trombone, percussion, piano, violin, ‘cello), 1998
 Serenata Concertante (flute, clarinet, flugel horn, French horn, percussion, piano, violin, ‘cello), 1999
 String Quartet No. 5, 2004
 Trio (violin, cello, piano), 2004
 Trio (clarinet, cello, piano), 2004

Works for solo instrument
Clarinet Sonata, 1950–51 
Suite of Variations on Medieval Melodies (‘cello), 1952, rev. 1954
A Set (clarinet), 1954, rev. 1974
Violin Sonata, 1954
Harmonica Piece, 1954
Quodlibets (flute), 1954 
Fantasy (piano), 1958 
Fantasy-Variations (violin), 1962 
Parisonatina al’dodecafonia (‘cello), 1964 
B, A, B, B, IT, T (clarinet with extensions), 1966 
Strata (bass clarinet), 1966 
Pianississimo, piano sonata, 1970 
Impromptu for Roger (piano), 1977 
Fantasies and Impromptus (piano), 1980 
Quodlibets II (flute), 1980 
Suite in Old Form (Parody Suite) (piano), 1982
Twelve Preludes (piano), 1991 
15, 5, 92, A.B. (clarinet), 1992 
A Birthday Card for Alea III (clarinet), 1997
 Romanza (violin), 2000
 Sonata (violin), 2003
 Violin Sonata No. 2, 2004

Vocal works
Separate Songs (high voice and piano), 1951
All day I hear the noise of waters (James Joyce) 
The half-moon westers low, my love (A. E. Housman)
From "The Bad Child’s Book of Beasts" (Hilaire Belloc) (high voice and piano), 1952
The Lion, the Tiger
The Frog
The Microbe
Portraits: a Secular Cantata (Edna St. Vincent Millay, Walt Whitman, e.e. Cummings) (mezzo-soprano and baritone solos, chorus, orchestra), 1954 
Arrangement of Anyone lived in a pretty how town (SATB chorus, piano 4 hands, optional percussion, 1955 
Three Songs (James Joyce) (soprano/tenor or bass, piano), 1955
Alone
Tutto e sciolto (in English)
A Memory of the Players in a Mirror at Midnight
Two Rilke Songs (mezzo-soprano and piano), 1961
Die Laute
Aus einem Sturmnacht VIII;
Seven Pious Pieces (Robert Herrick) (chorus with optional piano/organ), 1972 
Paradiso Choruses (Dante) (solo voices, chorus, orchestra, tape), 1974 
The White Island (SATB chorus and chamber orchestra), 1985

Film scores
The White Rooster, c1950, unpublished
The Lonely Crime, 1958, unpublished

Other works
Augenmusik, a Mixed Mediocritique (actress/danseuse/uninhibited female percussionist, tape), 1972 
Many popular songs and jazz arrangements, all unpublished

References 
Barkin, Elaine, and Martin Brody (2006). "Martino, Donald (James)". Grove Music Online, edited by Deane L. Root. (updated 18 January). Oxford Music Online (accessed 26 August 2017).
 Fischer, Heinz-Dietrich, ed. (2001). "1974 Award: About the Chamber Music Piece Notturno by Donald J. Martino". In The Pulitzer Prize Archives: Part E, Liberal Arts: Volume 15, Musical Composition Awards 1943-1999: From Aaron Copland and Samuel Barber to Gian-Carlo Menotti and Melinda Wagner, edited by Heinz-Dietrich Fischer in cooperation with Erika J. Fischer, 121–24. Munich: K. G. Sauer. .
Griffiths, Paul (2002). "Martino, Donald (James)". The Oxford Companion to Music, edited by Alison Latham. Oxford and New York: Oxford University Press. 
Los Angeles Times Staff (2005). Los Angeles Times: Obituary of Donald Martino. Retrieved December 25, 2005.

Bibliography

Articles by Martino
Martino, Donald. 1961. "The Source Set and Its Aggregate Formations." Journal of Music Theory 5: 224-273.
Martino, Donald. 1964. "Claudio Spies: 'Tempi'." Perspectives of New Music 2/2: 112-124.
Martino, Donald. 1966. "Notation in General - Articulation in Particular." Perspectives of New Music 4/2: 47-58.
Martino, Donald, and Ricci, Robert. 1968. "Wherefore Modern Music?" Music Educators Journal 55: 94-96.
Martino, Donald. 1971. "In Memoriam Stravinsky." Perspectives of New Music 9/2-10/1: 64.
Martino, Donald. 1972. "Exotic Winds." The Musical Times 113/1555: 865.
Martino, Donald. 1974. "In Memoriam Dallapiccola." Perspectives of New Music 13/1: 240-245.

Interview with Martino
Martino, Donald, and Boros, James. 1991. "A Conversation with Donald Martino." Perspectives of New Music 29/2 (Summer): 212-278.

Further reading
Boros, James. 1991. "Donald Martino's Fantasy Variations: The First Three Measures." Perspectives of New Music 29/2 (Summer): 280-293.
Brody, Martin. 1991. "MSHJ: Faith and Deeds in The White Island." Perspectives of New Music 29/2 (Summer): 294-311.
Dembski, Stephen. 1991. "Misreading Martino." Perspectives of New Music 29/2 (Summer): 312-317.
Fogg, Jonathan Leonard Ryan. 2006. An Aggregate of Styles: Donald Martino’s 'Fantasies and Impromptus'. A Treatise presented in partial fulfillment of the requirements for the Degree of Doctor of Musical Arts, Graduate School of The University of Texas at Austin.
Kizas, Andrew J. 2004. From Octatonicism to Dodecaphony: A Study of Pitch Organization in Selected Works by Donald Martino. A Dissertation prepared for the Degree of Ph.D., University of Western Ontario.
Kizas, Andrew J. 2009. The Music of Donald Martino: A Theory of Pitch Organization in Selected Works. Saarbrücken, Germany: VDM Verlag.
Klumpenhouwer, Henry. 1991. "Aspects of Row Structure and Harmony in Martino's Impromptu Number 6." Perspectives of New Music 29/2 (Summer): 318-354.
Krims, Adam. 1991. "Some Analytical Comments on Text and Music in Martino's 'Alone'." Perspectives of New Music 29/2 (Summer): 356-380.
Kyr, Robert. 1991. "Point/Counter-Point: Donald Martino's Radical Statement of Mind and Soul." Perspectives of New Music 29/2 (Summer): 382-392.
Littleton, Laurann. 1981. An Analysis of Martino's 'Fantasies and Impromptus' For Solo Piano. A Thesis submitted in partial fulfillment of the requirements for the Degree of Master of Arts, Eastman School of Music.
Nicholls, David. 1992. "Donald Martino: a survey of his recent music." Music & Letters 73/1: 75-79.
Rothstein, William. 1980 "Linear Structure in the Twelve-Tone System: An Analysis of Donald Martino's 'Pianississimo'." Journal of Music Theory 24: 129-165.
Stadelman, Jeffrey. 1991. "A Symmetry of Thought." Perspectives of New Music 29/2 (Summer): 402-439.
Vishio, Anton. 1991. "An Investigation of Structure and Experience in Martino Space." Perspectives of New Music 29/2 (Summer): 440-476.
Webb, Glenn. 2014. The Percussion Music of Donald Martino. A document submitted in partial fulfillment of the requirements for the Degree of Doctor of Musical Arts, University of Nevada.
Weinberg, Henry. 1963. "Donald Martino: 'Trio' (1959)." Perspectives of New Music 2/1 (Fall-Winter): 82-90.
Yang, Yoon Joo. 2011. A Practical Approach to Donald Martino's Twelve-Tone Song Cycles: 'Three Songs' and 'Two Rilke Songs,' for Performance. A Dissertation prepared for the Degree of Doctor of Musical Arts, University of North Texas.

Notes

External links 
 Publisher's website
 Interview with Donald Martino, January 12, 1991

American male classical composers
American classical composers
Pulitzer Prize for Music winners
20th-century classical composers
Yale University faculty
New England Conservatory faculty
Brandeis University faculty
Harvard University faculty
1931 births
2005 deaths
Musicians from Plainfield, New Jersey
Plainfield High School (New Jersey) alumni
Composers for piano
Twelve-tone and serial composers
Pupils of Luigi Dallapiccola
Pupils of Roger Sessions
20th-century American composers
Albany Records artists
20th-century American male musicians
Fulbright alumni